Ramensky (masculine), Ramenskaya (feminine), or Ramenskoye (neuter) may refer to:

People
Johnny Ramensky (1905–1972), Scottish criminal and war hero
Leonty Ramensky (1884–1953), Russian/Soviet ecologist

Places
Ramensky District, a district of Moscow Oblast, Russia
Ramenskoye Urban Settlement, a municipal formation which the Town of Ramenskoye in Ramensky District of Moscow Oblast, Russia is incorporated as
Ramensky (inhabited locality) (Ramenskaya, Ramenskoye), several inhabited localities in Russia